Eaton Square School is a co-educational and independent day school.

The schools and educational stage

Eaton Square Nursery Schools 
Eaton Square Nursery schools are located across four sites in Belgravia, Knightsbridge, Pimlico and Eccleston Square.

Eaton Square Belgravia 
The Belgravia site is a pre-preparatory and preparatory school for pupils aged 2 to 11

Eaton Square Senior School  
Eaton Square Mayfair is a private co-educational secondary day school for children aged 11–16 in London's Mayfair district, based at 106 Piccadilly, a Grade I-listed townhouse, which opened in September 2017.

106 Piccadilly was designed in 1761 by Robert Adam as the London residence of George Coventry, 6th Earl of Coventry, and was home to the St James's Club for more than a century.

The school is owned by Minerva Education, an independent school provider, which is owned in turn by a private equity firm run by former JP Morgan banker Philip Rattle. In 2017, fees were £22,500 a year.

References

External links
 

Educational institutions established in 2017
2017 establishments in England
Grade I listed buildings in the City of Westminster
Private co-educational schools in London
Private schools in the City of Westminster